The Art of Excellence is an album by Tony Bennett that was released in 1986.  It was his first album after re-signing with his former label Columbia Records and began a rise in popularity that would continue through the 1990s.

Track listing
 "Why Do People Fall in Love?/People" (Dennis Lambert, Brian Potter, Bob Merrill, Jule Styne) – 4:05
 "Moments Like This" (Burton Lane, Frank Loesser) – 2:47
 "What Are You Afraid Of?" (Jack Segal, Robert Wells) – 3:01
 "When Love Was All We Had" (Jorge Calandrelli, Sergio Mihanovich) – 5:08
 "So Many Stars" (Alan Bergman, Marilyn Bergman, Sérgio Mendes) – 3:44
 "Everybody Has the Blues" (James Taylor) – 3:37
 "How Do You Keep the Music Playing?" (Alan and Marilyn Bergman, Michel Legrand) – 4:20
 "City of the Angels" (Fred Astaire, Tommy Wolf) – 2:24
 "Forget the Woman" (Ettore Stratta) – 3:16
 "A Rainy Day" (Howard Dietz, Arthur Schwartz) – 2:59
 "I Got Lost in Her Arms" (Irving Berlin) – 4:27
 "The Day You Leave Me" (Cy Coleman, C. Gore) – 2:46

Personnel
 Tony Bennett  – Vocals 
 Ralph Sharon  – Piano
 Paul Langosch     – Bass
 Joe LaBarbera – Drums

References

1986 albums
Tony Bennett albums
Columbia Records albums